Megan Hine  is a British survival consultant, adventurer, television presenter and writer. She is known for her work alongside Bear Grylls on Mission Survive (2015, 2016), Car Vs Wild (2013) and Bear Grylls: Breaking Point (2015). She has also worked on a number of other television shows. She is an expedition guide and one of Bear Grylls' survival consultants.

Credits

Presenting
  The Curse of the Lost Amazon Gold
 Bear Grylls: Mission Survive Series 1 (2015) (6 part)
 Bear Grylls: Mission Survive Series 2 (2016) (6 part)
 The Homerun - Survival Expert (2012)
 Weather Terror (2015)
 I Shouldn’t Be Alive Climbing and falling stunt double
 Car Vs Wild 4x4 stunt driver
 Jungle Expedition 4x4 stunt driver
 Namibia Expedition 4x4 stunt driver

Behind the scenes

 Running Wild: Bear Grylls (2015-2016) (5 part) - Safety/Survival Consultant/Journey Producer
 Bear Grylls: Mission Survi (2015-2016) (12 part) - Safety/survival consultant
 Bear Grylls: Breaking Point (2015) (6 part) - Safety/Survival consultant
 Car Vs Wild (2013-2014) (10 part) - Safety/Survival consultant/Stunt driver
 I Shouldn't be Alive (2011) (1 part)- Climbing expert/Safety/survival consultant
 Man Vs Wild (2010-2011) (2 part) - Rope Safety consultant

Books
 Mind of a Survivor'', published in 2017

References

Living people
British television presenters
People from Canterbury
Survivalists